Unis is a Canadian French language specialty channel. The channel broadcasts general entertainment programming, with a particular focus on highlighting francophone communities outside Quebec.

The channel shares a broadcasting licence with its sister channel, TV5 Québec Canada (TV5), which focuses on international and Quebec francophone programming.

History
After the Canadian Radio-television and Telecommunications Commission's (CRTC) call for applications regarding services who wish to be regulated to be distributed on the basic package of all television service providers in Canada, TV5's application was made public in January 2013. Within this application, TV5 proposed an additional service, Unis, which would operate under TV5's existing broadcast licence as a secondary feed, and would "offer programming focused primarily on reflecting the diversity of the Canadian Francophonie," while TV5 would continue to focus on offering programming primarily reflecting the international Francophonie.

The application was approved on August 8, 2013.

The channel launched on September 1, 2014.

Programming
Programmes airing on the channel include Couleurs locales, a cultural newsmagazine series; Balade à Toronto, a music series showcasing live performances by francophone artists; Vu de l’intérieur, a documentary series on homes and interior design; J’habite ici, a documentary series showcasing towns and cities through the eyes of local francophone residents; Qu’est-ce qu’on sauve?, a series profiling people committed to protecting animals or safeguarding historical buildings in Ontario; Ma caravane au Canada; Canada plus grand que nature; 5e élément and Pense vite!.

In 2015, the channel announced that it had commissioned its first original dramatic series, St. Nickel. The series, filmed in Sudbury, Ontario by Carte Blanche Films, debuted on Unis in 2016.

Acquired programming
Alfred Hitchcock présente
Angela, 15 ans
Les années coup de cœur
Chair de poule
Cochon dingue
Dans une galaxie près de chez vous
Dead Zone
Degrassi : nouvelle génération
La famille Addams
Le loup-garou du campus
Malcolm
La quatrième dimension
Radio Enfer
Ramdam
Tactik
Twin Peaks
Watatatow

Non-animated kids' shows
Canot Cocasse
Cornemuse
Ouache!
Xavier et Mamie
Comme dans l'espace

Cartoons
The channel also airs cartoons, including:
Anatane : Les Enfants D'Okura
Angelo la Débrouille
Ariol
Arthur
Atomic Betty
Bali
Blaise le blasé
Boruto: Naruto Next Generations / Naruto Spin-Off: Rock Lee & His Ninja Pals (Anime)
Boule et Bill
Brico club
Bruno et les Bananamis
Caillou
Le chat dans le chapeau est un futé rigolo
Chop suey trio
Chronokids
Colis de la Planète X
Le diabolique Monsieur Kat
Dimitri
La Famille pirate
Franny et les chaussures magiques
Galaxie academie
Garderie Waf Waf
Grabouillon
Harry et ses dinosaures
Il était une fois... les découvreurs
Il était une fois... les explorateurs
Il était une fois... l'Homme
Il était une fois... notre Terre
Inspecteur Gadget
Iris, le gentil professeur
La Famillie Passiflore
Lanfeust
Léa et Gaspard
Madeline
Marsupilami
Martha bla bla
Martin mystère
Maya l'abeille
Mes bestioles chéries
Minivers
Le monde de Pahé
Mona le Vampire
Le monde selon Kev
Musti
Les mysterieuses cites d'or
Les mystères de Richard Scarry
Nelly et César
Papyrus
Patates et dragons
Les Popilous
Les P'tits Diables
Pok et Mok
Rastasouris
Renard et Lapine
Rocky Kwaterner
Roger
Sarah & Couac
T'choupi
Tom Sawyer
Walter et Tandoori
Wounchpounch
Yam Roll, héros du sushi

References

External links
  

2014 establishments in Quebec
Analog cable television networks in Canada
Companies based in Montreal
French-language television networks in Canada
Television channels and stations established in 2014